The Borscht Belt, or Jewish Alps, is a colloquial term for the mostly defunct summer resorts of the Catskill Mountains in parts of Sullivan, Orange, and Ulster counties in the U.S. state of New York, straddling both Upstate New York and the northern edges of the New York metropolitan area. A source interviewed by Time magazine stated that visits to the area by Jewish families were already underway "as early as the 1890s ... Tannersville ... was 'a great resort of our Israelite '...from the 1920s on [there were] hundreds of hotels".

A 2019 review of the history is more specific: "in its heyday, as many as 500 resorts catered to guests of various incomes". These resorts, and also the Borscht Belt bungalow colonies, were a popular vacation spot for New York City Jews from the 1920s through the 1960s. By the late 1950s, many began closing, with most gone by the 1970s, but some major resorts continued to operate, a few into the 1990s. Grossinger's Catskill Resort Hotel closed in 1986 and the Concord Resort Hotel struggled to stay open until 1998, and was subsequently demolished for a possible casino site.

Name
The name comes from borscht, a soup of Ukrainian origin, made with beetroot as the main ingredient giving it a deep reddish-purple color, that is popular in many Central and Eastern European countries and brought by Ashkenazi Jewish and Slavic immigrants to the United States. The name is a play on existing colloquial names for other American regions (such as the Bible Belt and Rust Belt).

History
In the 1920s and into the 1930s, some hotels and resorts' advertisements refused to accept Jews and indicated "No Hebrews or Consumptives" in their ads. This issue led to a need for alternatives that would readily accept Jewish families as guests. One report states that the larger hotels provided "Friday night and holiday services as well as kosher cooking".

At the hotels, "food was of primary importance ... there was a sense that ‘too much was not enough'", according to one source. "To understand the emphasis on food", writes Johnathan Sarna, "one has to understand hunger. Immigrants had memories of hunger, and in the Catskills, the food seemed limitless".

The singles scene was also important; many hotels hired young male college students to attract the single girls of a similar age. One book about the era said that the Catskills "became one great marriage broker".

Borscht Belt hotels, bungalow colonies, summer camps, and kuchaleyns (a Yiddish name for self-catered boarding houses) flourished. The bungalows usually included
"a kitchen/living room/dinette, one bedroom, and a screened porch" with entertainment being simple: bingo or a movie.  The kuchaleyns were also visited often by middle and working-class Jewish New Yorkers. Because of the many Jewish guests, this area was nicknamed the Jewish Alps and "Solomon County" (a modification of Sullivan County) by many people who visited there.

Resorts of the area included Avon Lodge, Brickman's, Brown's, Butler Lodge, The Concord, Grossinger's, Granit, the Heiden Hotel, Irvington, Kutsher's Hotel and Country Club, the Nevele, Friar Tuck Inn, the Laurels Hotel and Country Club, the Pines Resort, Raleigh Hotel, the Overlook, the Tamarack Lodge, Shady Nook Hotel and Country Club, Stevensville, Stier's Hotel, and the Windsor. Some of these hotels originated from farms that were established by immigrant Jews in the early part of the 20th century.

Two of the larger hotels in High View (just north of Bloomingburg) were Shawanga Lodge and the Overlook. One of the high points of Shawanga Lodge's existence came in 1959 when it was the site of a conference of scientists researching laser beams. The conference marked the start of serious research into lasers. The hotel burned to the ground in 1973.

The Overlook, which offered entertainment and rooms, as well as bungalows, was operated by the Schrier family.

The Granit Hotel and Country Club, located in Kerhonkson, boasted many amenities, including a golf course. It closed in 2015, and was renovated and turned into the Hudson Valley Resort and Spa, which closed in 2018. The property was sold in May 2019 to Hudson Valley Holding Co. LLC. The company did not announce its plans for the hotel.

Decline
According to Time, "the Borscht Belt resorts reached their peak in the 1950s and 60s, accommodating up to 150,000 guests a year" but the start of a decline was apparent by the late 1960s. "Railways began cutting service to the area, the popularity of air travel increased, and a younger generation of Jewish-Americans chose other leisure destinations." Another source mentions a secondary factor: "anti-Semitism declined, so Jews could go other places".

Access to the area improved with the opening of the George Washington Bridge and upgrade of old travel routes such as old New York State Route 17. On the other hand, passenger train access ended with the September 10, 1953 termination of passenger trains on the Ontario and Western Railway mainline from Roscoe at the northern edge of Sullivan County, through the Borscht Belt, to Weehawken, New Jersey. A 1940 vacation travel guide published by the railroad listed hundreds of establishments that were situated at or near the railway's stations. The following year the New York Central ceased running passenger trains on its Catskill Mountain Branch. The area suffered as a travel destination in the late 1950s and especially by the 1960s. Another source also confirms that "cheap air travel suddenly allowed a new generation to visit more exotic and warmer destinations". More women remained in the workforce after marriage and could not take off for the entire summer to relocate to the Catskillls.

According to a recent source, by the early 1960s, some 25 to 30 percent of Grossinger's visitors were not Jewish.

A Times of Israel article specifies that "the bungalow colonies were the first to go under, followed by the smaller hotels. The glitziest ones hung on the longest" with some continuing to operate in the 1980s and even in the 1990s. The Concord, which outlasted most other resorts, went bankrupt in 1997 but survived until 1998.

In 1987, New York's mayor Ed Koch proposed buying the Gibber Hotel in Kiamesha Lake to house the homeless. The idea was opposed by local officials. The hotel instead became the religious school Yeshiva Viznitz.

21st century
The Heiden Hotel in South Fallsburg, which was the location of the movie Sweet Lorraine starring Maureen Stapleton, was destroyed by fire in May 2008.

The Stevensville Hotel in Swan Lake, owned by the family of accused Bernard Madoff accomplice David G. Friehling, reopened as the Swan Lake Resort Hotel.

The former Homowack Lodge in Phillipsport was converted into a summer camp for Hasidic girls. Officials of the state Department of Health ordered the property evacuated in July 2009, citing health and safety violations.

Many Buddhist and Hindu retreat centers have been constructed on the land or in the restored buildings of former camps or resorts to serve adherents in New York City, the establishment of which has then drawn even more temples and centers to the area. This led to the coining of the nickname 'Buddha Belt', 'Bhajan Belt', or 'Buddhist Belt' to refer to the area's revival.

Between 2013 and 2018 the decaying state of the abandoned resorts was captured by several ruins photographers:

The Flagler Hotel, Nemerson, Schenk's and Windsor Hotels in South Fallsburg, and the Stevensville Hotel in Swan Lake, were converted into Jewish religious summer camps.
Grossinger's Catskill Resort Hotel; the Grossinger's complex partially was demolished in 2018 and a new owner planned to build a hotel, homes and other amenities. A remaining structure on the property was destroyed by fire in August 2022.
The former Gilbert's Hotel and Brickman Hotel are not part of the Siddha Yoga SYDA complex. A gift shop remains open at the sites, which are not in current active use.
Lesser Lodge
Nevele Grand Hotel
The Vegetarian Hotel
Kutsher's Hotel and Country Club; a wellness club was built on the site; it opened in June 2018. The original Kutcher's nightclub is all that remains of the original hotel. The Kutcher's Hotel front electric sign was donated to the Sullivan County Historical Museum.
The Pines Hotel golf course was converted into a Jewish religious housing site. The Pines Hotel dilapidated main building and surrounding structures remain in decay.
White Lake Mansion House
Homowack Lodge
Tamarack Lodge
Concord Resort Hotel; In February 2018, Resorts World Catskills opened on the site of the old hotel.

As of the 2010s, the region is a summer home for many Orthodox Jewish families. Some of the hotels have been converted into rehab centers, meditation centers or Orthodox Jewish hotels and resorts. The Orthodox Jews who flock to the region each summer provide commerce that the area would not have otherwise.

Comedic legacy

The tradition of Borscht Belt entertainment started in the early 20th century with the indoor and outdoor theaters constructed on a 40-acre (16-hectare) tract in Hunter, New York by Yiddish theater star Boris Thomashefsky.

A cradle of American Jewish comedy since the 1920s, the Borscht Belt entertainment circuit has helped launch the careers of many famous comedians and acted as a launchpad for those just starting out.

Comedians who got their start or regularly performed in Borscht Belt resorts include:

Joey Adams
Woody Allen
Morey Amsterdam
Sandy Baron
Benny Bell
Milton Berle
Shelley Berman
Mel Brooks
Lenny Bruce
George Burns
Red Buttons
Sid Caesar
Jean Carroll
Jack Carter
Myron Cohen
Bill Dana
Rodney Dangerfield
Phyllis Diller
Totie Fields
Betty Garrett
Estelle Getty
George Gobel
Gretchen Grape
Shecky Greene
Buddy Hackett
Mickey Katz
Danny Kaye
Alan King
Robert Klein
Jack E. Leonard
Pesach Burstein
Mal Z. Lawrence
Sam Levenson
Jerry Lewis
Jackie Mason
Lou Menchell
Jan Murray
Freddie Prinze Sr.
Carl Reiner
Don Rickles
Joan Rivers
Freddie Roman
Allan Sherman
Jackie Vernon
Murray Waxman
Jonathan Winters
Henny Youngman

Borscht Belt humor refers to the rapid-fire, often self-deprecating style common to many of these performers and writers. Typical themes include:

 Bad luck
 Puns: "Sire, the peasants are revolting!" "You said it. They stink on ice." (Harvey Korman as Count de Money (Monet) and Mel Brooks as King Louis XVI, in History of the World Part I)
 Physical complaints and ailments (often relating to bowels and cramping): "My doctor said I was in terrible shape. I told him, 'I want a second opinion.' He said, 'All right, you're ugly too! "I told my doctor, 'This morning when I got up and saw myself in the mirror, I looked awful! What's wrong with me?' He replied, 'I don't know, but your eyesight is perfect! (Dangerfield)
 Aggravating relatives and nagging wives: "My wife and I were happy for twenty years. Then we met." (Dangerfield). "Take my wife—please!" (Henny Youngman); "My wife drowned in the pool because she was wearing so much jewelry." (Rickles); "My wife ain't too bright. One day our car got stolen. I said to her, 'Did you get a look at the guy?' She said, 'No, but I got the license number. (Dangerfield) "This morning the doorbell rang. I said 'Who is it?' She said 'It's the Boston Strangler.' I said 'It's for you dear! (Youngman)

Popular culture

These resorts have been the setting for movies such as Dirty Dancing (Kutsher's), Sweet Lorraine, and A Walk on the Moon.

Characters inspired by Borscht Belt comics include Billy Crystal's Buddy Young Jr. from Mr. Saturday Night and Robert Smigel's Triumph the Insult Comic Dog.

Frank Oz, who is of Polish Jewish descent, modeled Fozzie Bear on Borscht Belt comics.

In the 1960 film Murder, Inc., Walter Sage (Morey Amsterdam) is shown performing at the fictional Ribbon Lodge in the Catskills.

In the 1976 film The Front, set in 1953, comedian Hecky Brown (Zero Mostel), harassed by HUAC, has an ill-fated gig in the Catskills.

In the film Sleepers, a poster for Sonny Liston is seen on the wall of Robert De Niro's apartment and shows the Pines Resort in Fallsburg, New York as the location of the fight. The scene is when they are talking about the defense of the trial and De Niro's talk to Jason Patric and Minnie Driver.

In the Season 3 episode of the 1990s live-action sitcom Sabrina the Teenage Witch, "Sabrina's Real World", Hilda Spellman accidentally puts on a literal, magical "borscht belt" that causes her to tell stand-up jokes non-stop and won't come off until she's told one million jokes.

In the online game Mobsters, A Borscht Belt Comedian is a henchmen needed for a mission involving taking over a Catskill Resort.

The early-20th-century Jewish experience of vacationing in the Catskills was recounted in the graphic short story "Cookalein" by Will Eisner. The story appears in Eisner's collection A Contract with God.

The novel Marjorie Morningstar was about the same era and locale, but the corresponding film was made in the Adirondacks rather than the Catskills.

Several episodes of Season 2 of The Marvelous Mrs. Maisel are set in the Catskills and depict Catskill resort living in detail.

See also
History of the Catskill Mountains
Chitlin' Circuit
Sawdust trail

References

External links
 The Catskills Institute at Northeastern University
 
 Four Seasons Lodge, a documentary about a bungalow colony of Holocaust survivors in the Catskills
 . Drone Video footage of The Pines and Grossinger's.
 The Borscht Belt: Visiting the Remains of America's Jewish Vacationland

 
Jewish comedy and humor
Catskills
 
 
Economy of Ulster County, New York
History of Ulster County, New York
Jewish theatre
Vaudeville theaters